Valentina Plazas (born April 18, 2000) is a Colombian–American figure skater who currently competes in pairs. With her skating partner, Maximiliano Fernandez, she is the 2022 CS U.S. Classic bronze medalist.

Personal life 
Plazas was born on April 18, 2000, in Bogotá, Colombia, to parents Diego Plazas and Lina Medina. She has a younger sister, Natalia. Plazas immigrated to the United States from Colombia with her family when she was six years old.

Plazas is a graduate of Charles W. Flanagan High School, and Florida International University with a degree in criminal justice.

Career

Early years 
Plazas began learning how to skate at age 12. Before transitioning to pair skating, she was a two-time national medalist on the U.S. collegiate level. For a time, she considered representing her native Colombia internationally as a single skater, but ultimately chose to partner with Fernandez for the United States in February 2020.

Programs

With Fernandez

Competitive highlights 
GP: Grand Prix; CS: Challenger Series

Pairs with Fernandez

Singles career

References

External links 
 

2000 births
Living people
American female pair skaters
Colombian sportspeople
American people of Colombian descent
Sportspeople from Bogotá
Colombian emigrants to the United States
Florida International University alumni